Pratihar, Parihar  is a Rajput clan.

References

Rajput clans